Kapilas Road Junction railway station is a railway station on the East Coast Railway network in the Cuttack district of Odisha, India. It serves Kapilas Road. Its code is KIS. It has five platforms. Passenger, MEMU, Express trains halt at Kapilas Road Junction railway station.

Major trains
 Sri Jagannath Express

References

Railway stations in Cuttack district
Khurda Road railway division